The Nlaka'pamux Nation Tribal Council, formerly the Fraser Thompson Indian Services Society, is a First Nations government Tribal Council comprising bands in the Fraser Canyon and Thompson Canyon areas of the Canadian province of British Columbia.  It is one of three tribal councils of the Nlaka'pamux people, the others being the Nicola Tribal Association and the Fraser Canyon Indian Administration.  The Lytton First Nation, which is the government of the largest Nlaka'pamux community, does not belong to any of the three.

Chief Matt Pasco is the tribal chair of the NPTC, having been selected in 2020. Pasco is the son of Grand Chief Bob Pasco who had held the position for almost 40 years.

Member Bands

Ashcroft First Nation
Boothroyd First Nation (Boston Bar)
Boston Bar First Nation
Oregon Jack Creek Band (near Ashcroft)
Spuzzum First Nation (also a member of the Fraser Canyon Indian Administration)

See also
Thompson language
List of tribal councils in British Columbia

References

External links
BC Ministry of Aboriginal Relations and Reconciliation information page with map

First Nations tribal councils in British Columbia
Nlaka'pamux governments
Fraser Canyon
Thompson Country